Gene Reynard Atkins (born November 22, 1964) is a former American football safety in the National Football League who played for the New Orleans Saints and Miami Dolphins from 1987 to 1996.  He played previously for Florida A&M and James S. Rickards High School, both in Tallahassee.  He is the father of Geno Atkins, American football defensive tackle who is currently a free agent. He was featured on HBO's Real Sports with Bryant Gumbel in a story about former football players who are suffering from head injuries that happened during their playing time.  In the story, it was said that Atkins is suffering from the early stages of dementia. He was featured in the movie Head Games, which was released in 2012.

References

External links
Databasefootball entry
Gene Atkins: Discarded, Disabled and Forgotten

1964 births
Living people
American football safeties
New Orleans Saints players
Miami Dolphins players
Florida A&M Rattlers football players
Players of American football from Tallahassee, Florida
National Football League replacement players